Attorney General Crawford may refer to:

Coe I. Crawford (1858–1944), Attorney General of South Dakota
George W. Crawford (1798–1872), Attorney General of Georgia

See also
General Crawford (disambiguation)